Oiva Arttur Sala (formerly Salin, October 31, 1900 - March 7, 1980) was a Finnish actor.

He had roles in 37 movies from the 1940s onwards.

He earned Order of the Lion of Finland award in 1958.

Sala was on a radioplay Knalli ja sateenvarjo just before his death.

Partial filmography

 Kajastus (1930)
 Kersantilleko Emma nauroi? (1940) - Asko Nännimäinen
 Amor hoi! (1950) - Editor
 Isäpappa ja keltanokka (1950) - Miettinen, preparator
 Katarina kaunis leski (1950) - Tuomiokapitulin herra
 Rakkaus on nopeampi Piiroisen pässiäkin (1950) - Factor
 Sadan miekan mies (1951) - Nikko
 Silmät hämärässä (1952) - Sokea
 Rikollinen nainen (1952) - Pekka - vanginvartija
 Yhden yön hinta (1952) - Drunken
 Radio tulee hulluksi (1952) - Radio worker
 Lännen lokarin veli (1952) - Photographer
 Hän tuli ikkunasta (1952) - Monsieur Calle
 Niskavuoren Heta (1952) - Punakaartilainen (uncredited)
 Maailman kaunein tyttö (1953) - Editor
 Siltalan pehtoori (1953) - Hugo Mandelcrona
 Hilja, maitotyttö (1953) - 2. herra
 Laivan kannella (1954) - Kapakoitsija
 Onnelliset (1954) - 1st mister
 Minä ja mieheni morsian (1955) - Pierre
 Helunan häämatka (1955) - Sacristan
 Viisi vekkulia (1956) - Vicar Leevi Sammal
 Pikku Ilona ja hänen karitsansa (1957) - Parrakas mies
 Risti ja liekki (1957) - Mestari Petrus
 1918 (1957) - Tuomiokapitulin jäsen
 Autuas eversti (1958) - Passenger on the train
 Pieni luutatyttö (1958) - Julius
 Lumisten metsien tyttö (1960) - Storekeeper Salkin
 Nuoruus vauhdissa (1961) - Director
 Kaasua, komisario Palmu! (1961) - Humalainen herrasmies
 Kultainen vasikka (1961) - Businessman
 Sissit (1963) - Luutnantti
 Totuus on armoton (1963) - Oitti
 Täällä Pohjantähden alla (1968) - Rovasti Wallen

External links

1900 births
1980 deaths
20th-century Finnish male actors